Statistics of Latvian Higher League in the 1927 season.

Overview
It was contested by 4 teams, and Olimpija won the championship.

League standings

References
 RSSSF

Latvian Higher League seasons
Lat
Lat
Football